The University of Pharmacy, Mandalay, located in Mandalay, is one of two pharmacy schools in Myanmar. The university offers a Bachelor of Pharmacy (B.Pharm.) degree which is a 4-year full-time.

See also
 University of Pharmacy, Yangon

References

External links
Official website

Universities and colleges in Mandalay
Medical schools in Myanmar
Universities and colleges in Myanmar